Douglas Edvard Melin (4 October 1895 – 29 March 1946) was a Swedish zoologist and athlete. He was nephew of Olof Melin.

Athletic career
He competed in the men's standing long jump at the 1912 Summer Olympics. He was also an avid boxer.

Scientific career
Melin was an all-sided zoologist who got his education at the Uppsala University and spent his career there. In 1923–26 he led an expedition to Brazil and Peru, which resulted in a large number of zoological specimens as well as ethnographic and cartographic observations. Melin was skeptical about Darwin's theories, which led to his isolation as a scientist.

References

External links
 

1895 births
1946 deaths
Swedish zoologists
Swedish entomologists
Swedish herpetologists
Swedish male long jumpers
Olympic athletes of Sweden
Athletes from Gothenburg
Uppsala University alumni
Academic staff of Uppsala University
Athletes (track and field) at the 1912 Summer Olympics